Tunstall is a village in north Lancashire, England. In the 2001 census the civil parish of Tunstall had a population of 105. In the 2011 census Tunstall was grouped with Cantsfield (2001 pop. 76) to give a total of 223.

To the north east of the village is the Grade I listed Church of St John the Baptist.

Several houses, a restaurant, a village hall, and a tennis court make up most of the village of Tunstall. The restaurant/pub, called the Lunesdale Arms hosts many village activities, such as carol services and quizzes. 

To the south of the village is Thurland Castle, which dates from the fourteenth century. It was made ruinous following a siege in 1643, restored in 1809 and 1829, then gutted by fire in 1879 and rebuilt. It is now divided into apartments.

See also

Listed buildings in Tunstall, Lancashire

References

External links

Villages in Lancashire
Civil parishes in Lancashire
Geography of the City of Lancaster